Seoul Train is a 2004 documentary film that deals with the dangerous journeys of North Korean defectors fleeing through or to China. These journeys are both dangerous and daring, since if caught, they face forced repatriation, torture, and possible execution.

Seoul Train has been broadcast on television around the world, including on the PBS series Independent Lens.  In January 2007, Seoul Train was awarded the Alfred I. duPont – Columbia University Silver Baton for excellence in broadcast journalism. In April 2007, "Seoul Train" was named runner-up in the National Journalism Awards.

The film was produced, directed, and filmed by Jim Butterworth, a technology entrepreneur in Colorado in the United States, and Lisa Sleeth of Incite Productions.  It was co-directed and edited by Aaron Lubarsky, a documentary filmmaker in New York City.

Awards
 2007 Alfred I. duPont – Columbia University Awards — Silver Baton for excellence in broadcast journalism (broadcast equivalent of the Pulitzer Prize).
 2007 National Journalism Awards — Runner-up, Jack R. Howard award for excellence in electronic media/TV-cable.
 2006 INPUT: International Public Television Screening Conference (Taipei, Taiwan)
 2005 ONE WORLD – Priština Film Festival (Priština, Kosovo) — Winner, Jury Award for Best Film.
 2005 Libertas – Dubrovnik Film Festival (Dubrovnik. Croatia)
 Winner, Audience Award for Best Film.
 Winner, Jury Award for Best Documentary.
 2005 Crested Butte Reel Fest (Crested Butte, CO)
 Winner, Audience Award for Best Film.
 Winner, Silver Award (Jury) for Best Documentary.
 2005 Brooklyn International Film Festival (Brooklyn, NY) — Winner, Independent Spirit Award (Jury).
 2005 Jackson Hole Film Festival (Jackson Hole, WY) — Winner, Best Global Insight Film (Jury).
 2005 Artivist Film Festival (Los Angeles, CA) — Winner, Jury Award for Best Human Rights Documentary
 2005 Texas Film Festival — Winner, Audience Award for Best Documentary.
 2005 Milan International Film Festival (Milan, Italy) — Winner, Jury Award for Best Editing.
 2005 Big Sky Documentary Film Festival — Finalist, Jury Award for Best Short Documentary
 2005 Boulder International Film Festival (Boulder, CO) — Winner, Jury Award for Best Documentary.
 2004 Ft. Lauderdale Int’l Film Festival (Ft. Lauderdale, FL) — Winner, Jury Award for Best Documentary.

See also
 The Defector: Escape from North Korea

References

External links
 
 
 PBS's "Independent Lens" website about "Seoul Train"
 Ironweed Films' article on "Seoul Train"
 Wall Street Journal review on "Seoul Train"
 The New York Times review on "Seoul Train"

2004 films
2004 documentary films
American documentary films
American independent films
Documentary films about China
Documentary films about North Korea
Documentary films about human rights
Documentary films about refugees
Biographical documentary films
Documentary films about children
Films set in China
Films set in North Korea
Films set in South Korea
Films set in Seoul
Films set in Poland
2000s Mandarin-language films
2000s Korean-language films
Polish-language films
Human rights in North Korea
Films about North Korean defectors
2000s English-language films
2000s American films